Charlie Pearson was an Australian rules footballer who played with Essendon during the 1880s. He is credited as being one of the first people to attempt high flying marks where a player jumps on the back of another in order to take a mark.  Nicknamed the Commotion, he was considered one of the finest players of his era.

Due to his work at a rural sheep station in Queensland he only played sporadically for Essendon.  In the 1920s, he was reported to be managing a cattle station in Argentina.

References

External links

Essendon Football Club (VFA) players
Place of birth missing
Australian rules footballers from Queensland
Year of birth missing
Year of death missing